Jean-Jacques Acquevillo (born 17 January 1989) is a French handball player, playing for USAM Nîmes Gard.

He represented France at the 2021 World Men's Handball Championship in Egypt.

References

External links

1989 births
Living people
French male handball players